Macroscelides flavicaudatus (common name: Namib round-eared sengi  or Namib round-eared elephant shrew) is a species of elephant shrew in the family Macroscelididae found in the central Namib desert and southern Namibia.

Discovery and identification
Macroscelides flavicaudatus was first described by Lundholm as Macroscelides proboscideus flavicaudatus, a subspecies of M. proboscideus. The type specimen had been collected by the Plague Research Laboratory of the South African Institute for Medical Research, "six miles from the mouth of the Omaruru River" in Namibia. It is distinguished by the lighter coloration of its fur. 
Nine other subspecies of M. proboscideus had previously been described; while Corbet and Hanks dismissed the variation between these as continuous, they retained M. p. flavicaudatus.

Upon genetic and morphological analysis, Dumbacher et al. found that the two subspecies were significantly divergent, and proposed elevating both to the rank of species.

References

Elephant shrews
Mammals of Namibia
Endemic fauna of Namibia
Mammals described in 1955